Parapedobacter luteus is a Gram-negative, non-spore-forming and aerobic bacterium from the genus of Parapedobacter which has been isolated from cotton waste compost in Suwon in Korea.

References

External links
Type strain of Parapedobacter luteus at BacDive -  the Bacterial Diversity Metadatabase	

Sphingobacteriia
Bacteria described in 2010